Spergularia tasmanica is a species of flowering plant from the genus Spergularia. The species was originally described by L.G.Adams in 2008

References

tasmanica